Ariarathes VII Philometor ("mother-loving") (Ariaráthēs Philomḗtōr; reigned in 116–101 BC or 111–100 BC), King of Cappadocia, was the first son of King Ariarathes VI of Cappadocia and his wife Laodice of Cappadocia. Ariarathes VII had an older sister called Nysa and a younger brother called Ariarathes VIII of Cappadocia.

In his first years he reigned under the regency of his mother Laodice, the eldest sister of the King Mithridates VI of Pontus. During this period the kingdom was seized by King Nicomedes III of Bithynia, who married Nysa. Nicomedes III was soon expelled by Mithridates VI, who restored upon the throne Ariarathes VII.  However, Ariarathes VII objected to his father's assassin, and ally of Mithridates VI, Gordius, having a role in the government of Cappadocia.  So Mithridates VI had Ariarathes VII killed in 101 BC.  Mithridates VI then put onto the Cappadocian throne his own 9 year old son, Ariarathes IX of Cappadocia, with Gordius as the regent for the young king.

References
Hazel, John; Who's Who in the Greek World, "Ariarathes VII", (1999)
Head, Barclay; Historia Numorum, "Cappadocia", (1911)

Kings of Cappadocia
2nd-century BC rulers in Asia
Ariarathid dynasty
2nd-century BC murdered monarchs